Hamadryas albicornis is a species of cracker butterfly in the family Nymphalidae. It is found in Peru.

References

External links 
Hamadryas albicornis (Staudinger, [1885]) at Butterflies of America

Hamadryas (butterfly)
Butterflies described in 1885
Nymphalidae of South America
Taxa named by Otto Staudinger